Viktoriia Ishchiulova (Russian: Виктория Ищиулова, born 17 September 2004) is a Russian Paralympic swimmer. She has a congenital limb deficiency. Ishchiulova won one gold and two silver medals at the 2020 Summer Paralympics.

Career
Ishchiulova represented Russian Paralympic Committee athletes at the 2020 Summer Paralympics and won gold in the 50 metre freestyle S8 event and won silver in the 100 metre butterfly S8 and the 4 × 100 m medley relay events.

References

2004 births
Living people
People from Orsk
Russian female backstroke swimmers
Russian female butterfly swimmers
Russian female freestyle swimmers
Russian female medley swimmers
Paralympic swimmers of Russia
Medalists at the World Para Swimming Championships
Medalists at the World Para Swimming European Championships
Swimmers at the 2020 Summer Paralympics
Medalists at the 2020 Summer Paralympics
Paralympic medalists in swimming
Paralympic gold medalists for the Russian Paralympic Committee athletes
Paralympic silver medalists for the Russian Paralympic Committee athletes
S8-classified Paralympic swimmers
Sportspeople from Orenburg Oblast